Murray Bridge may refer to.

Murray Bridge, South Australia, a city and locality
Rural City of Murray Bridge, a local government area in South Australia
Corporate Town of Murray Bridge, a former local government area in South Australia

See also
Murray Bridge Airport, an airport in South Australia
Murray Bridge railway station, a railway station in South Australia
Murray Bridge Speedway, a speedway venue in South Australia
Murray Bridge Training Area, a military training area in South Australia
Murray Bridge Tunnel, a railway tunnel in South Australia
Murray Bridge East, South Australia
Murray Bridge North, South Australia
Murray Bridge South, South Australia
Murray (disambiguation)